Zakaria Ariffin (born 22 July 1952) is a Malaysian playwright, theater director and educator.

Brief biography and creativity 
Ariffin was born at Kuantan, where he graduated from high school. In 1974, he entered the Pedagogical College of Sultan Idris in Tanjung Malim, but only studied there for five months. During that time, however, he was acquainted with the playwright Noordin Hassan, who liked how he staged his play The Door. In 1975, on the advice of the master, he entered the Faculty of Performing Arts at the University of Science in Penang. His teachers were well-known theater-makers and directors, Kala Devata (Mustafa Kamil Yasin), Ghulam Sarwar, Gus Nasaruddin, Krishen Jeet, and Zainal Latif. At the same time, he took an active part in Penang's theatrical group, Angkatan Sasaran, both as an actor and as a stage director. He began writing and staging his plays, starting with Penunggu Warisan, in 1977.

After graduating from the university in 1978, he started work in the department of literature of The Institute of Language and Literature of Malaysia (DBP), where he had the opportunity to communicate with well-known writers, such as Usman Awang, Osman Zainuddin, Johan bin Jaafar, Atondra, and Malina Manjoy. Here he joined the theatrical company of the DBP "Anak Alam" and played in such productions as Hunchback from Tanjung Putri by Shahrom Hussein, Visitors at Kenny Hill by Usman Awang, Hatta Azad Khan's Seven corpses and statues, and Where the Moon Always Cracks from A. Samad Said. Along with this, he continued to write plays himself: The Opera House (1978), The King of the Fools (1993), Do Not Kill Sam (1994), The Woman of the English Lieutenant (1995). These were mostly of protest and satirical character with elements of Malay opera (bangsawan). Some of his plays attracted the attention of Central Television (for example, If you are not lucky, you will not get lucky). The cooperation with Noordin Hassan continued; in particular, in 1994 he took part in staging his play, This night the tortoise cried.

In 1996, he moved to the National Academy of Arts as a lecturer, where he soon headed the theater department. There he staged his new plays This is not the end (1996), Teja (1997), Imam (1998), and also, with the support of the Ministry of Culture, large-scale productions of the old ones—The Opera House (1988), King of the fools (1997), Siti Zubaidah (2000)—on the stage of the prestigious Palace of Culture in Kuala Lumpur. In 2001, he initiated the wayang (traditional puppet theater) Nusantara Festival, held in Kuala Lumpur. In 2007, he published the play Kesuma, which resonated widely in theater circles. In 1997, he participated in the international writing program at Iowa University (USA).

As a theater critic, he published the books, Modern Malay Drama in Essays (1981) and The Drama of Three Epochs (1984).

Awards 
 Esso-Gapen II Prize (1988–89)
 Literary Prize of Malaysia (1988–89)
 Award "Seri Angkasa" of Radio and Television of Malaysia (1988–89)
 S.E.A. Write Award (2001)
 Literary Prize of Johor (2007)
 State prize in the field of art (in the nomination for individual achievements, 2009)

Selected works 
 Indahnya pelangi. Iustrasi [With illustations by] Ibrahim Md. Said. Kuala Lumpur: Dewan Bahasa dan Pustaka, 1985.
 Samad Ismail. Kuala Lumpur: Dewan Bahasa dan Pustaka, 1991 (совместно с др.)
 Usman Awang. Kuala Lumpur: Dewan Bahasa dan Pustaka, 1991 (совместно с др.)
 Biografi seniman negara Rahman B. Kuala Lumpur: Sierra Focus Sdn. Bhd., 2005

As editor
 
 Glosari istilah kesusasteraan.  Kuala Lumpur: Dewan Bahasa dan Pustaka, 1988 (совместно с др.).
 (ред.) Modern ASEAN Plays: Malaysia. Kuala Lumpur: ASEAN Committee on Culture & Information, 1994

Plays
 Perantau zaman. Kuala Lumpur: Dewan Bahasa dan Pustaka 1986
 Pentas opera . Kuala Lumpur : Dewan Bahasa dan Pustaka, 1989
 The opera house . Translator: Solehah Ishak. Kuala Lumpur: Dewan Bahasa dan Pustaka,  1989
 Keris Mas. Kuala Lumpur: Dewan Bahasa dan Pustaka, 1989 (совместно с др.)
 Siti Zubaidah: Sebuah skrip bangsawan  Kuala Lumpur: Istana Budaya, 2001
 
 Merdeka! merdeka! merdeka!: Sebuah drama sejarah. Kuala Lumpur : Istana Budaya, 2006
 Trilogi Raja Lawak. Kuala Lumpur: ITBM, 2014

Theatre and film criticism and theory 
 
 Filem: Karya dan karyawan (kumpulan esei dan kritikan filem) Kuala Lumpur: Akademi Seni Kebangsaan, 2005.

Educational 
 Mengenal Budaya Bangsa. Kuala Lumpur: Dewan Bahasa dan Pustaka, 1990.
 Kemahiran hidup bersepadu kemahiran teknikal (Tingkatan 1, 2, 3 KBSM)  (cовместно с K. H. Khiu). Petaling Jaya: PEP Publications, 2009
 Kemahiran hidup bersepadu: Kemahiran teknikal. (Tingkatan 1, 2 & 3 KBSM) (совместно с Rubiah Effendi).  Petaling Jaya, Selangor : PEP Publications, 2012

References

Further reading 
 

Malaysian people of Malay descent
Malaysian writers
Malaysian literature
Malaysian dramatists and playwrights
1952 births
Living people
Universiti Sains Malaysia alumni